Henson Glacier is a glacier flowing northward from the Detroit Plateau in Graham Land, Antarctica, and merging with Wright Ice Piedmont about  southwest of Hargrave Hill. It was mapped from air photos taken by Hunting Aerosurveys Ltd (1955–57), and was named by the UK Antarctic Place-Names Committee for William S. Henson, the English designer of a powered model aeroplane (1842–43) which led to widespread aeronautical research and development.

References

Glaciers of Davis Coast